Victoria Hæstad Bjørnstad (born 1999) is a  Norwegian orienteer who competes internationally, and runs for the club Fossum IF.

She represented Norway at the 2021 European Orienteering Championships, where she won a bronze medal in the Sprint relay with the Norwegian team, along with Eskil Kinneberg, Kasper Fosser and Andrine Benjaminsen. She also competed in the Knock-out sprint, where she qualified for the quarter finals.

References

1999 births
Living people
Norwegian orienteers
Foot orienteers
Female orienteers
20th-century Norwegian women
21st-century Norwegian women
Junior World Orienteering Championships medalists
Competitors at the 2022 World Games
World Games medalists in orienteering
World Games silver medalists